The Man Ray bar was a restaurant-bar in Paris, France. It is named after the artist Man Ray.

A former cinema, the bar was once part-owned by American actors Johnny Depp, Sean Penn and John Malkovich,  and was located at 34 Rue Marbeuf (near the Champs-Élysées). It was managed by Thierry Klemeniuk.  
The club has since been renamed "World Place", comprising the Lobster Cafe, The Lounge and The Club. This trendier cousin of the Buddha Bar, with a similar neo-Asian décor, changed its name to Mandalaray in 2005.

Man Ray music 
The following are all currently released Man Ray bar compilation CDs:
Man Ray, Vol. 1
Man Ray, Vol. 2
Man Ray, Vol. 3

References

Compilation album series
Restaurants in Paris
Drinking establishments in France